Alıçlı is a village in the Ömerli District of Mardin Province in Turkey. The village is populated by the Mhallami and had a population of 381 in 2021.

References 

Villages in Ömerli District
Mhallami villages